A low budget release centered on the title track, which was a Top Twenty hit for Lou Reed in 1973.

Track listing
 "Walk on the Wild Side"
 "Sweet Jane" (live)
 "White Light/White Heat" (live)
 "Sally Can't Dance"
 "Nowhere at All"
 "Coney Island Baby"

References

1992 greatest hits albums
Lou Reed compilation albums
RCA Records compilation albums